Bantu Football Club is a Lesotho football club based in Mafeteng.

The team currently plays in Lesotho Premier League.

History
Bantu F.C. was formed in 1927 as Flying Sweeps of Mafeteng and later renamed Bantu F.C. The founders were the then district Commissioner Button in Consultation with the four Principal Chiefs of Mafeteng.

The team was given the name Bantu after it was alleged that the first tribes to arrive in the district were Matebele hence the chiefs had to rule different tribes and clans which were all the Bantu speaking people. Thus, the rationale behind the name was meant to unite all the tribes in Mafeteng.

The team has always been regarded as a district number one priority in Mafeteng district. Over the years it has strived to be one of the top football brands in Lesotho and some other parts of Southern Africa as evident from both local and international accolades conferred.
The traditional colours of Bantu are black and gold which are the celebrated colours of Mafeteng district. The team is nicknamed A Mats’o Matebele and its supporters Makaota. Home stadium is Leshoboro Seeiso Sports Complex in Mafeteng, alternative stadiums are Setsoto and Maputsoe DiFA in Maseru and Leribe respectively.

Club Management
 President : Mr. Leuta John Leuta
 1st Vice President : Mrs. Mamoji Letsapo
 2nd Vice president : Mr. Tseliso Ramatla
 3rd Vice President : Mr. Panyane Phiri
 Secretary General and Head of Legal: Adv. Tefo Rabolinyane (Mr.)
 Vice Secretary General: Adv. Mokhethi Raphuthing (Mr.)
 Member Admin: Ms. Tankiso Moteletsane
 Member Technical: Mr. Thabang Letele
 Communication and Marketing Manager: Mr. Pule Mosoatsi
 General Manager: Mr. Sethabela Pule
 Chief Finance Officer: Mr. Pitso T'sasanyane
 Team Manager: Mr. Moruti Sekokotoana

.

Sponsors

 Metropolitan Lesotho
 Naledi Funeral Planners

Through the hard work of the Bantu executive board, A Matšo Matebele is willing to source multiple sponsorships and partnerships for the benefit of the club. Bantu is very serious about lifting the shadow of amateur football.

Performance in CAF competitions
Bantu represented Lesotho for the first time in CAF Competitions by appearing at the CAF Cup Winners Cup (Confederations Cup) in 1993. Bantu was drawn against Black Africa of Namibia and for the first leg of the preliminary round; it had to travel for a long distance by bus from Mafeteng to Windhoek, Namibia only to find that their opponents won’t play because of Political instability in the country. Then, Bantu progressed to the second round where they played against Witbank Black Aces of South Africa.

CAF Champions League: 4 appearances

 2015– Preliminary Round
 2017 – Preliminary Round
 2018 – First Round
 2020 –Preliminary Round

CAF Cup Winners' Cup: 2 appearances

 1994 – First Round
 1998 – Preliminary Round

CAF Confederation Cup: 1 appearance

 2018 – Play-off Round

Achievements
Lesotho Premier League: 4
2013/2014 Vodacom-Ls Premier League champions
2016/2017 Vodacom-Ls Premier League champions
2017/2018 Econet Telecom-Ls Premier League champions.
2019/2020 Champions.
Lesotho Independence Cup (Top4):8 
1963 Independence Cup Top4 Championships
1993 Independence Top4 Champions
1997 Independence Top4 Champions
2011 Top4 Independedence Top4 Champions
2012 Independence Top4 Champions
2013 Independence Top4 Champions
2015 Independence Top4 Champions
2017 Independence Top4 Champions.

Lesotho National Insurance Group Top8 Cup: 1
2016 LNIG Top8 Champions.

Current squad

Technical team
 Moeketsi Abram Mongoya - Coach*
 Victor Tlholo - Assistant Coach*
 TBA - Assistant Coach 2
 Leuta Makhoa - Goalkeepers Coach
 Sebili Pita - Physio
 'Majulia Kulehile Team Manager
 Kubutu Mokoenya - Kit Manager*

Former coaches

  Thabo Tsutsulupa
  Bob Atang Mafoso
  James Madidilane
  Katiso Mojakhomo
  Motlatsi Shale
  Caswell Moru
  Ntebele 'Tata Mcholene' Taole
  Mokhele Mokhele
  Lehlohonolo Thotanyane

Best players

Hlompho Kalake * 

Lehlohonolo Fothoane * 

Thabo Lesaoana * 

Ntsane Lichaba *

Foreign players

Lindokuhle Phungulwa *

Bantu FC Supporters

Bantu has the craziest and most vibrant fans in Lesotho football. It is also one of the most progressive clubs. The club now has over 40,000 followers on Facebook which is the highest recorded number of football club followers in the country. In short, Bantu has laid down a marker for all clubs in the country to follow.

Some of the notable outstanding players over the years
 Scara Meikente 1940s/50s
 City Mats’oara 1960s
 Dessert Mohapi 1960s
 Chippa Mathibeli 1960s
 Naughty Rabolinyane 1960s
 Zero Sehapi 1960s
 Success Mosoeu 1980s
 Valdez Lesenyeho 1980/90s
 Popo ‘Pretty boy’ Mats’oara 1980s/1990s
 Lehlohonolo Seema 1990s
 Sekeleme Lephole 1990s
 Morapeli ‘Sprinter’ Tlali 1990s
 Holo Mafantiri 1990s
 Tsepo ‘Motion’ Jobo 1990s
 Lebohang ‘Tona’ Sekatle 1990s
 Thabiso ‘Cellular Phone’ Mokhoele 1990s
 Thato ‘Chocco’ Ralethoko 1990s
 Tlali ‘Cabazela’ Maile 2000s-2016
 Thapelo "Tenda" Mokhehle 2000-2021

References

External links
 Soccerway
 
 
 www.bantufc.co.ls

Lesotho Premier League clubs